The Baltimore and Ohio Related Industries Historic District comprises a portion of Martinsburg, West Virginia to either side of the Baltimore and Ohio Railroad line as it runs through the city. The district includes the Baltimore and Ohio Railroad Martinsburg Shops, a National Historic Landmark, and a variety of industrial and commercial concerns that depended on the railroad.

Along with buildings, the district includes the infrastructure associated with the building of the railroad in an urbanizing environment, such as the channelizing of Tuscarora Creek and a variety of culverts, underpasses and retaining walls. Significant buildings include, apart from the roundhouse/shop complex, the B. & O. Railroad station and hotel.  Industrial buildings include coal yards, a plaster mill, feed mills, a distillery and other manufacturing facilities.

References

External links

Baltimore and Ohio Railroad
Historic districts in Martinsburg, West Virginia
Industrial buildings and structures on the National Register of Historic Places in West Virginia
Historic American Engineering Record in West Virginia
Italianate architecture in West Virginia
Rail infrastructure in West Virginia
Rail transportation in West Virginia
Railway buildings and structures on the National Register of Historic Places
Historic districts on the National Register of Historic Places in West Virginia
Railway buildings and structures on the National Register of Historic Places in West Virginia